Richard Arthur "Dick" Draeger (born September 22, 1937) is an American rower who competed in the 1960 Summer Olympics.

He was born in Pasadena, California. In 1960 he was a crew member of the American boat which won the bronze medal in the coxed pairs event.

References 

1937 births
Living people
Rowers at the 1960 Summer Olympics
Olympic bronze medalists for the United States in rowing
American male rowers
Medalists at the 1960 Summer Olympics